Lieutenant General Sheikh Ahmed bin Rashid Al Maktoum (born 12 July 1951) is the Deputy Chairman of Dubai Police & Public Security, Group Chairman of A.R.M. Holding and Dubai Real Estate Centre and Chairman of the Al Wasl FC club located in Dubai.

He is the fourth and youngest son of the late ruler, Rashid bin Saeed Al Maktoum (1912–1990) and the youngest brother of the Vice President and Prime Minister of the United Arab Emirates, and Ruler of Dubai Mohammed bin Rashid Al Maktoum

Education and early career

Sheikh Ahmed graduated from the Royal Military Academy Sandhurst and joined the Central Military Command in Dubai and became its Commander in Chief, developing it into one of the leading military bases in the United Arab Emirates.

Business interests
Sheikh Ahmed's business interests include the Dubai Real Estate Centre (DREC) established in 1991 with more than 3200 units across the residential, commercial, retail and industrial real estate segments in Dubai under its management and operation.
 
In 2019, Sheikh Ahmed consolidated his assets under A.R.M. Holding, one of the biggest investment companies in Dubai mandated with supporting the Emirate of Dubai's growth. The conglomerate holds in addition to Dubai Real Estate Centre, Huna and Hive Coliv and equity stakes in private and publicly listed companies in a variety of sectors globally including Education, F&B, Real Estate, Banking, Telecommunications and Hospitality.

Sportsmanship

Sheikh Ahmed founded in 1960 Al Wasl Sports Club, which he also chairs, and one of the most popular football leagues in the UAE, Al Wasl Football Club. Both clubs are the recipients of numerous titles and have a sizeable following.

He is one of the main figures responsible for the creation and launch of Dubai International Marine Club and was its first Chairman in 1988. The Club is the first in the Middle East and Africa to be a member in UIM.

Horsemanship

Sheikh Ahmed is an avid horseman and created the Jebel Ali Racecourse to promote horse racing in the UAE and launched Al Adiyat and Dubai Horse Racing Centre in support of the industry. He and his team helped develop the handicapping system and other rules of racing.

He claimed his first win in 1982 when his first horse, Wassl, won the Irish 2000 Guineas and the Craven Stakes. Other horses owned by Sheikh Ahmed have won the 1000 Guineas, Irish Oaks, Irish St Lager, Dewhurst Stakes, Gold Cup, Dubai Golden Shaheen, UAE 2000 Guineas, Italian Derby, Prince of Wales Stakes, Coral Eclipse Stakes Pretty Polly stakes and King George VI and Queen Elizabeth Stakes in Australia. Mtoto, Sheikh Ahmed's most celebrated stallion, won seven out of ten races throughout his racing career that lasted between 1985 and 1988, most notable of which were the King George VI and Queen Elizabeth Stakes in 1988.

Ancestry

References

1956 births
Living people
Emirati politicians
Emirati racehorse owners and breeders
Ahmed bin Rashid Al Maktoum
Al-Wasl F.C.
People from Dubai
Sons of monarchs